Edward Keating (July 9, 1875 – March 18, 1965) was an American newspaper editor and politician. In turns a Colorado newspaper editor, U.S. Representative (1913–1919) from Colorado, advocate for better working conditions for the laboring class, and long time editor (1919–1953) of the newspaper Labor (jointly owned by several railroad unions), Keating engaged in many political campaigns throughout the United States to elect union-friendly legislators. He was Huey Long's preferred pick to be Secretary of Labor where he to become President.

Biographical

Edward Keating was born to Irish immigrants Stephen Keating, a widower, and Julia O’Connor Quinlan, a widow, on a small farm near Kansas City, MO.  When his father died his mother moved with him to Pueblo, CO, Greeley, CO, and eventually Denver, CO, where he attended public school until he decided to quit school and look for work. He married Mrs. Margaret Sloan Medill, September 1, 1907, who died February 15, 1939. On May 3, 1941, he married Eleanor Mary Connolly (1889–1977).  There were no children from either marriage. Keating died in Washington, D. C., March 18, 1965. He was interred in Cedar Hill Cemetery, Suitland, Maryland.  Religious affiliation was Roman Catholic.

Journalism career in Colorado

Keating at age 14 became a copyholder on the Denver Republican.  City editor of Denver Times 1902–1905.  Editor Rocky Mountain News 1906–1911. Purchased the Pueblo (CO) Leader in 1912. President of the Denver Press Club 1905–1907. President of the International League of Press Clubs in 1906 and 1907.

Political career in Colorado

Although Keating began his political career by being active in the Populist Party, by the mid 1890s he had joined the Democrats and remained a Democrat the rest of his life.  He was City Auditor of Denver 1899–1901.In 1903 he was a  member of the first convention elected to draft a charter for the city of Denver. During 1911–1913 he was President of the Colorado State Board of Land Commissioners.

Political career in Washington, D.C
Elected as a Democrat to the Sixty-third, Sixty-fourth, and Sixty-fifth Congresses (March 4, 1913 – March 3, 1919). In the Sixty-fifth Congress, Keating was chairman of the Committee on Expenditures in the Post Office Department. He was unsuccessful in his bid for reelection in 1918.

In 1916, along with Robert Owen, sponsored a bill called the Keating–Owen Child Labor Act of 1916,which barred the interstate commerce of goods produced by children. Shortly after the act went into effect it was declared unconstitutional; nevertheless, it is regarded as a historic landmark in the story of the regulation of child labor in the United States.  Several states already had child labor laws but these varied widely.  Although bills regulating child labor had been introduced in previous congressional sessions they did not pass.  The Keating-Owen bill was the first to become a law and thus became the first federal intervention in the tackling of the child labor problem. (Later many of the provisions of the Keating-Owen Act were incorporated into other labor legislation which was upheld by the Supreme Court.) 	

In April, 1917, Keating was one of fifty Congressman that voted against the House Resolution for War against Germany.

In 1919 introduced the Keating War Powers Bill to regulate child labor in certain industries.	

Member Congressional Joint Committee on Reclassification of Salaries for Civilian Employees in the District of Columbia, March 1919 – April 1920.

Campaign manager (1919) for the Plumb Plan sponsored by the Plumb Plan League,

Journalism career in Washington, D.C.
In 1919 founding editor and manager of a national weekly paper Labor (Washington,D.C.) sponsored by fifteen associated railroad labor organizations and continued in those capacities until his retirement on April 1, 1953.

Writings

Under the pen name, Raymond Lonergan, contributed a weekly Washington column for the
Chicago Tribune during most of his years as Labor's editor.

The Story of Labor: Thirty-three Years on Rail Workers’ Fighting Front (1953) – reminiscences of his years as editor of the union newspaper Labor and the numerous political campaigns it became involved in.

The Gentleman from Colorado, a memoir (1964) – Not a coherent autobiography but a series of reminiscences about  people and incidents Keating was connected with.  Many of the stories have a what-really-happened behind the scenes slant.  There are five sections: early life,  newspaper and political stories, interesting people, congressional experiences and the railroad unions

Notes

References

  
 
 

1875 births
1965 deaths
20th-century American journalists
20th-century American politicians
American people of Irish descent
Democratic Party members of the United States House of Representatives from Colorado
Editors of Colorado newspapers
Politicians from Denver
Politicians from Kansas City, Kansas